Gut is a monthly peer reviewed medical journal on gastroenterology and hepatology. It is the journal of the British Society of Gastroenterology and is published by BMJ. , the editor-in-chief is Emad El-Omar.

Gut was established in 1960 and covers original research on the gastrointestinal tract, liver, pancreas, and biliary tract. The journal has annual supplements covering the presentations from the British Society of Gastroenterology Annual General Meeting. British Society of Gastroenterology clinical practice guidelines are also published as supplements to the journal. , subscribers to Gut also receive a copy of Frontline Gastroenterology.

Abstracting and indexing
Gut is abstracted and indexed by Medline, Science Citation Index, Current Contents/Clinical Medicine, Current Contents/Life Sciences, Excerpta Medica, BIOSIS Previews and Scopus. According to the Journal Citation Reports, its 2020 impact factor is 23.059, ranking it third out of 92 journals in the category "Gastroenterology and Hepatology".

Highly cited articles
According to the Web of Science, some highly cited articles in Gut are:

References

External links

Publications established in 1960
Monthly journals
BMJ Group academic journals
English-language journals
Gastroenterology and hepatology journals